Michael Roberts is a former professional tennis player.

Roberts was a collegiate tennis player for UC Irvine before competing on the professional tour in the early 1990s, where he reached a best singles world ranking of 415. He made his only ATP Tour main draw appearance as a doubles qualifier at the 1990 Volvo Tennis Los Angeles tournament, partnering Van Winitsky.

ATP Challenger finals

Doubles: 1 (0–1)

References

External links
 
 

Living people

Year of birth missing (living people)

American male tennis players
UC Irvine Anteaters men's tennis players